Jerome Whitehead (September 30, 1956 – December 20, 2012) was an American professional basketball player. He was selected by the San Diego Clippers in the second round (41st overall) of the 1978 NBA draft. A 6'10" center-forward from Marquette University, Whitehead played in 11 National Basketball Association (NBA) seasons from 1978 to 1989. He played for the Clippers, Utah Jazz, Dallas Mavericks, Cleveland Cavaliers, Golden State Warriors and San Antonio Spurs.

In his NBA career, Whitehead played in 679 games and scored a total of 4,423 points.

In his junior season at Marquette University, Whitehead helped lead his Warriors to the 1977 national championship. In the semi-final game of the Final Four that season, Whitehead made a game-winning basket at the buzzer in the 1977 national semifinal victory over UNC-Charlotte on a length-of-the-court pass from Butch Lee. Previous to that, UNC-Charlotte's Cedric Maxwell had tied the game with only 3 seconds remaining. The game appeared to be headed for overtime when Whitehead's bucket won the game for the Warriors.

On December 20, 2012, Whitehead was found dead; an autopsy performed on December 21 found Whitehead died as a result of gastrointestinal hemorrhaging.

References

External links
Basketballreference.com page

1956 births
2012 deaths
African-American basketball players
All-American college men's basketball players
American men's basketball players
Basketball players from Illinois
Buffalo Braves draft picks
Cleveland Cavaliers players
Dallas Mavericks expansion draft picks
Dallas Mavericks players
Golden State Warriors players
Marquette Golden Eagles men's basketball players
Riverside City Tigers men's basketball players
San Antonio Spurs players
San Diego Clippers players
Sportspeople from Waukegan, Illinois
Utah Jazz players
Centers (basketball)
Power forwards (basketball)
20th-century African-American sportspeople
21st-century African-American people
Deaths from gastrointestinal hemorrhage